Guenter Knop (born June 1954, in Bremen, Germany) is a photographer known for black and white nudes of real women.

Knop began his career working in the studio of German fashion and advertising photographer Charlotte March in the late 1970s. He later worked as first assistant to Henry Wolf, art director for Esquire, Harper's Bazaar and Show magazines. He worked with Wolf for ten years on high fashion, TV, and print advertising for major clients in the eighties and nineties before opening a studio in Chelsea, Manhattan, United States. His pictures incorporate dramatic lighting and customized sets built from found materials and inspired by Bauhaus, Art Nouveau, and Art Deco designs. A unique feature of Knop’s work is his exclusive use of real women who are hand-picked from the streets of New York.

Books

Nudes Index, Koenemann Verlag, Germany, 1999
Indexi, Feierabend Verlag, Germany, 2002
Naked, Feierabend Verlag, Germany, 2004
Guenter Knop on Women, Steffen Verlag, Germany, 2005
The Nude Bible, Tectum Publishers, 2007
The Nude Bible II, Tectum Publishers, 2008

References 

 Ragazine.CC: Interview by Michael Foldes, with photo galleries, accessed on 7 December 2015

American photographers
Photographers from Bremen (state)
Living people
1954 births
Artists from Bremen
People from Chelsea, London
German emigrants to the United States